Lourenço de Almeida (c.1480 - March 1508) was a Portuguese explorer and military commander.

He was born in Martim, Kingdom of Portugal, the son of Francisco de Almeida, first viceroy of Portuguese India.  Acting under his father, Lourenço distinguished himself in the Indian Ocean, and made Ceylon (present Sri Lanka) tributary to Portugal (see Portuguese Ceylon). He belonged to the Order of Christ.

He made the first Portuguese voyage to Ceylon in 1505 and established a settlement there, thus permitting the expansion of the Portuguese Empire in Asia.

He defeated the fleet of the Zamorin at the Battle of Cannanore in 1506. Two years later however, he died in a naval action off Chaul, in India, at the Battle of Chaul.

See also
 Portuguese India
 Portuguese Ceylon

References

1508 deaths
16th-century explorers
Explorers of Asia
Explorers of India
16th-century Portuguese people
Portuguese explorers
Maritime history of Portugal
Portuguese in Kerala
People from Barcelos, Portugal
1480 births
Portuguese military personnel killed in action